Ganesha is a Hindu deity of intellect and wisdom.

Ganesha, Ganesh, or Gaṇeśa may also refer to:

Ganesh (album), a 1997 album by Aka Moon
Ganesh (1998 film), a 1998 Indian Telugu-language film 
Ganesh (2009 film), a 2009 Indian Telugu-language film 
Ganesa (gastropod), a genus of marine snails in the family Turbinidae
Ganesha (ctenophore), a genus of comb jellies
Ganesha (psychedelic), 2,5-dimethoxy-3,4-dimethylamphetamine, a hallucinogenic drug
Ganesha the Elephant, a fictional character from the Bloody Roar series
Ganesh Himal, a mountain range in Asia
Ganesa Macula, a dark feature on Saturn's moon Titan
Ganeshana Maduve, Kannada language film
Ganish, a village in Hunza valley of Pakistan
Khairatabad Ganesh, an idol of Ganesh in Hyderabad, India

Surname:
Chitra Ganesh, an artist based in Brooklyn, New York
Delhi Ganesh, a veteran Tamil film actor, who mostly acts in supporting roles
Dodda Ganesh (born 1973), a former Indian cricketer
Janan Ganesh, a British journalist
M. P. Ganesh (born 1946), a former Indian field hockey player from Karnataka
Raja Ganesha (1415) was a ruler of Bengal for a very short period, who overthrew the Ilyas dynasty rule from Bengal
Shankar–Ganesh, an Indian music director duo who worked in Tamil, Telugu, and Kannada movies for 40 years

Given name:
Ganesh (actor), Kannada language film actor
Ganesh Asirvatham, English language teacher from Klang, Selangor
Ganesh Baba, yogi and teacher in the tradition of Kriya Yoga
Ganesh Chand, Fijian academic and former politician of Indian descent
Ganesh Dutt KCSI, KCIE (1868–1943), Indian freedom fighter, administrator and educationist
Ganesh Ghosh (1900–1994), Bengali Indian freedom fighter, revolutionary and politician
Ganesh Hegde (born 1974), Indian singer and Bollywood choreographer, from Karnataka
Ganesh Jain, Bollywood film producer
Ganesh Man Singh, commander of Nepalese democratic movement of 1990 AD
Ganesh Mavlankar (died 1956), Indian politician
Ganesh Mylvaganam (born 1966), former United Arab Emirates cricketer
Ganesh Naik, Indian politician
Ganesh Patro, film writer
Ganesh Prasad Singh (born 1947), member of the 14th Lok Sabha of India
Ganesh Pyne, renowned Calcutta born Indian painter
Ganesh Satish (born 1988), Indian cricketer
Ganesh Shah (born 1949), Nepalese politician and Minister of Environment, Science and Technology
Ganesh Shankar Vidyarthi (1890–1931), fighter against oppression and injustice
Ganesh Singh (born 1962), a member of the 14th Lok Sabha of India
Ganesh Sittampalam, the youngest person to pass an A-level in 1988 at 9 yrs 4 months old
Ganesh Thapa, the present President of the All Nepal Football Association (ANFA)
Ganesh Vasudeo Joshi, social activist and elderly guiding philosopher in the Indian freedom struggle
Ganesh Venkatraman, a Tamil language actor
Gaṇeśa Daivajna, 16th century astronomer